Wendell L. Byrd is an American politician, businessman, and former accountant who has served in the Michigan House of Representatives since 2015.

Education 
Byrd earned a Bachelor's of Science degree in Accounting Development from the Detroit College of Business, now a part of Davenport University.

Career 
Before serving in the Legislature, Byrd worked as an accountant and tax auditor for the state of Michigan and as deputy comptroller of Ecorse, Michigan. He retired from the state after 28 years, and in 2013, was elected to the recently formed Detroit Police Commission. He is also a small business owner.

Byrd currently sits on the House Commerce and Trade, Energy and Tax Policy Committees.

He was previously a candidate for the Michigan House in 1998, 2000, 2004, and 2006.

References

External links
 

Living people
Democratic Party members of the Michigan House of Representatives
Politicians from Detroit
African-American state legislators in Michigan
21st-century American politicians
Year of birth missing (living people)
21st-century African-American politicians